Chicano is an ethnic, political, and cultural term used to refer to some Mexican Americans.

It may also refer to:

El Chicano, a 1970s and 1980s funky music group
Chicanos (comics), a comic book by Carlos Trillo and Eduardo Risso
El Chicano, ring name of Puerto Rican professional wrestler Carlos Cotto
El Chicano (film), a 2019 American superhero film
Chicanos Motorcycle Club, an outlaw motorcycle club

See also
Chicana feminism, a branch of feminist thought
Chicano art, a genre of visual art
Chicano English, a dialect of American English
Chicano literature, a literary genre
the Chicano Moratorium, a 1970 protest march against the Vietnam War
the Chicano Movement, a United States political and social movement
Chicano nationalism, a political and cultural ideology
Chicano Park, a park in San Diego, California
Chicano poetry, a poetic genre
Chicano rap, a genre of hip hop music
Chicano rock, a genre of rock music
Chicano Studies, an academic discipline